Inspectioneering Journal is a technical publication that focuses on mechanical integrity and reliability issues in the chemical and refining industries. It is published bi-monthly. The magazine was established in 1995 and is based in Houston, Texas.

References

External links
 

1995 establishments in Texas
Bimonthly magazines published in the United States
Engineering magazines
Magazines established in 1995
Magazines published in Texas
Mass media in Houston
Petroleum magazines
Professional and trade magazines